Quivicán is a town and municipality in Mayabeque Province of Cuba. It is located in the south west of the province, bordering the Gulf of Batabanó. The name is of Taino origin (spelled  Quibicán). It was founded in 1700.

Geography
The municipality is divided into the barrios of Quivican Pueblo, La Salud, San Felipe, Pablo Noriega, San Agustín, Guiro Boñingal, Güiro Marrero, Santa Mónica, Aguacate and Fajardo.

Demographics
In 2004, the municipality of Quivicán had a population of 29,253.

Notable people
 Chucho Valdés (b. 1941), pianist
 Alejandro Miguel Portal Oliva (b. 1995), soccer player

See also

Municipalities of Cuba
List of cities in Cuba
Quivicán Municipal Museum

References

External links

Populated places in Mayabeque Province